The ECAC Hockey Most Outstanding Player in Tournament is an annual award given out at the conclusion of the ECAC Hockey conference tournament to the best player in the championship as voted by the coaches of each ECAC team.

The Most Outstanding Player in Tournament was first awarded in 1962 and every year thereafter.

Three players (Ken Dryden, Rick Meagher and Jason Elliott) have received the award two separate times with Meagher doing so in non-consecutive years. From 1975 through 1977 the award was received by brothers Rick and Terry Meagher.

Award winners

Note: * recipient did not play for champion

Winners by school

Winners by position

See also
ECAC Hockey Awards
List of ECAC Hockey Men's Ice Hockey Tournament champions

References

General

Specific

External links
ECAC Hockey Awards (Incomplete)

College ice hockey trophies and awards in the United States